Amir ul-Mulk (1 January 1877 – 23 December 1923) was the Mehtar (ruler) of the princely state of Chitral. He assumed power after arranging for the murder of his brother Mehtar Nizam ul-Mulk. His tenure as Mehtar was brief as he was removed from office in less than three months, before having the chance to consolidate his position.

References

1877 births
Mehtars of Chitral
Princely rulers of Pakistan
1923 deaths
Nawabs of Pakistan